Union Station is the former central railway station in Wichita, Kansas. Since the end of passenger rail service to the city in 1979, it has been repurposed as commercial office space.

History
The station opened in 1914. Through the 1930s, it served as the city's primary arrival and departure point. Railroads including the Frisco, Santa Fe, and Rock Island offered passenger service to and from cities including Chicago, Los Angeles and St. Louis. 

The station closed in 1979 when Amtrak discontinued its Lone Star (Chicago–Houston) line, ending passenger rail access to the city. The nearest inter-city station is in Newton, 25 miles north, which is served by the Southwest Chief (Chicago–Los Angeles).

The station terminal and nearby buildings have since been redeveloped as a commercial office and retail campus. Cox Communications used the station as its local headquarters until 2007. In 2013, local commercial real estate company Occidental Management purchased Union Station and began renovations. As of 2017, renovations continue while Occidental has resumed leasing commercial space in the neighboring buildings.

The building's restoration was estimated at $54 million. Phase Two included the addition of 150,000 square feet of retail, restaurant and office space on the property's south side.

Future
In recent years,  several proposals have been made to bring back Amtrak service back to Wichita. This has predominantly surrounded the plan to extend the Heartland Flyer, which currently runs between Oklahoma City, Oklahoma and Fort Worth, Texas, north to Newton, Kansas. In June 2021, Amtrak released a plan that would add two more round trips between Oklahoma City and Fort Worth while extending the original round trip to Newton. A timeline for the service has not been determined.

References

Buildings and structures in Wichita, Kansas
Railway stations in the United States opened in 1914
Wichita
Wichita
Wichita
Wichita, Kansas
Former Amtrak stations in Kansas
Railway stations closed in 1979
1914 establishments in Kansas